Pozuzo District is one of eight districts of the Oxapampa Province in the Pasco Department of Peru. The two towns in the district are the capital, Pozuzo, population 1,366 in 2017, and Prusia, which is smaller. 

Pozuzo District is best known for the colonists from Austria and Germany who established one of the first European settlements (in Peru) east of the Andes in remote Pozuzo District in 1859. Traces of German culture remain in the architecture and culture of the district.

Tourism 

 Pozuzo Tourism

References